An immigration tariff is a charge levied on immigrants wanting permanent residency within a nation. As a means of applying price theory to a nation's immigration policy, it is generally advocated as an alternative to existing bureaucratic procedures as a means of moderating or better regulating the flow of immigration to a given level.

The idea is frequently associated with American economist Gary Becker, who stated, "When I mention this to people, they sometimes go hysterical."

Alex Nowrasteh, an immigration policy analyst, wrote a policy analysis arguing for immigration tariffs for the Competitive Enterprise Institute.

In March 2015 the Australian government launched an inquiry into the use of an immigration tariff as an alternative to existing immigration arrangements.

See also
 Tariff
 Green card
 Permanent residency
 Travel visa
 Immigration law
 Migrant levy
 Gary Becker
 Eric Weinstein
 Immigrant investor programs
 Economic citizenship

References

External links
 Eric Weinstein on use of the price mechanism to create markets for immigration (2002).
 Becker expounding upon the immigration tariff
 Australian Liberal Democrats promote immigration tariff 
 Article in The Economist examines immigration tariffs

Immigration
Customs duties